The Leadership Institute is a 501(c)(3) non-profit organization located in Arlington, Virginia that teaches "political technology."

The institute was founded in 1979 by conservative activist Morton Blackwell. Its mission is to "increase the number and effectiveness of conservative activists" and to "identify, train, recruit and place conservatives in politics, government, and media."

The Leadership Institute offers 44 types of training seminars at its Arlington headquarters, around the United States, and occasionally in foreign countries. In 2014, the Institute trained 18,182. Since its 1979 founding, the Leadership Institute has trained more than 161,271 students. Alumni include Grover Norquist, Ralph Reed, Jeff Gannon, Senator Mitch McConnell, Vice-President Mike Pence, James O'Keefe, new members of the 113th Congress, and elected officials in all 50 states.

Mission
The Leadership Institute's mission is to increase the number and effectiveness of conservative activists and leaders in the public policy process. To accomplish this, the Institute identifies, recruits, trains, and places conservatives in government, politics, and the media.

Founded in 1979 by its president, Morton C. Blackwell, the Leadership Institute (LI) teaches conservatives the nuts and bolts of how to succeed in the public policy process. The Institute strives to produce a new generation of public policy leaders unwavering in their commitment to free enterprise, limited government, strong national defense, and traditional values. Institute graduates are equipped with practical skills and professional training to implement sound principles through effective public policy.

Campus Reform

Campus Reform is LI's news website focused on higher education. The online publication's news offerings often highlight incidents of what they consider to be liberal bias on American college campuses.

See also

 Republican National Committee
 Young Republicans
 Young Republican National Committee
 Young Republican National Federation
 College Republican National Committee

References

External links
 
 YouTube website
 Organizational Profile – National Center for Charitable Statistics (Urban Institute)

Political organizations based in the United States
Non-profit organizations based in Arlington, Virginia
New Right organizations (United States)
1979 establishments in the United States
Organizations established in 1979
501(c)(3) organizations
Conservative organizations in the United States